WCHX (105.5 FM) is a mainstream rock music formatted commercial radio station from the Lewistown, Pennsylvania, market and serving the surrounding communities.
The station is owned by Mifflin County Communications, Inc.

Personalities
Current air personalities include:
 Buehler (Mornings - 6am until 10am)
 'Insane' Erik Lane (Afternoons - 3pm until 7pm)
 Nights with Alice Cooper (syndicated Evenings/Overnights)
 T Bone (Fill-in)

Additional Programming

Weekday programming includes:
Mifflin County Huskies Football (Fri Nights in season)
Lunchtime Rewind (noon until 1pm)
5 o'clock Rock Block (5pm until 6pm)

Weekend programming includes:

Carol Miller's Get The Led Out (Sat Night 7P - 8P)
House of Hair w/ Dee Snider (Sat Night 10P - Midnight) 
Acoustic Storm (Sun Morning from 9A to Noon)
Backyard Bands (Sun 6P - 7P) Local and Unsigned Band Spotlight Show
Off The Record (Sun Night 7P - 8P)
Pierre Robert's Classic Rock Live (Sunday Night 8P - 10P)
Full Metal Jackie (Sunday Night 10P - Midnight)

References

External links

CHX
Mainstream rock radio stations in the United States
Radio stations established in 1987